Nookala or Nukala (Telugu: నూకల) is one of the Indian surnames.

 Nookala Chinna Satyanarayana is a Carnatic musician, a classical vocalist, musicologist, author, teacher, a great administrator and motivator. 
 Nookala Narotham Reddy, past Vice chancellor of Osmania University and Rajya Sabha member.
 Nukala Ramachandra Reddy, a politician from the Telangana region. 
 Nookala Srinivas Reddy, Businessman, Director of Medha Servo Drives Pvt. Ltd.

Indian surnames